Over the Rainbow  is an album by saxophonist/composer Benny Carter recorded in 1988 and released by the MusicMasters label.

Reception

AllMusic reviewer Scott Yanow stated "Benny Carter has recorded so frequently since the mid-'70s that it must be a constant challenge to come up with new settings for his alto. This particular Music Masters CD finds Carter taking his place in a saxophone section ... The program is split evenly between standards and Carter compositions with the altoist also writing all of the colorful arrangements. This swinging and tasteful Benny Carter recording is a credit to his superb series of Music Masters dates".

Track listing
All compositions by Benny Carter except where noted
 "Over the Rainbow" (Harold Arlen, Yip Harburg) – 8:20
 "Out of Nowhere" (Johnny Green, Edward Heyman) – 5:39
 "Straight Talk" – 9:24
 "The Gal from Atlanta" – 7:39
 "The Pawnbroker" (Quincy Jones) – 5:18
 "Easy Money" – 11:10
 "Ain't Misbehavin'" (Fats Waller, Harry Brooks, Andy Razaf) – 9:04
 "Blues for Lucky Lovers" – 5:38

Personnel 
Benny Carter – alto saxophone, arranger
Herb Geller – alto saxophone
Frank Wess, Jimmy Heath – tenor saxophone
Joe Temperley – baritone saxophone
Richard Wyands – piano
Milt Hinton – bass
Ronnie Bedford – drums

References 

1989 albums
Benny Carter albums
MusicMasters Records albums